Rainer Hönisch (born 1936) is a German cyclist. He was born in Berlin, and competed for the SC Dynamo Berlin / Sportvereinigung (SV) Dynamo. He won bronze at the 1978 UCI Track Cycling World Championships in the 1 km time trial for amateurs.

References 

German male cyclists
German track cyclists
1936 births
Cyclists from Berlin
Living people
20th-century German people